Little Washington may refer to:

 Washington, North Carolina, the county seat of  Beaufort County
 Washington, Pennsylvania, county seat of Washington County
 Washington, Virginia, the county seat of Rappahannock County
 The Inn at Little Washington, an award-winning restaurant and inn in Washington, Virginia
 Little Washington, Virginia, a now mostly uninhabited African American village in Loudoun County, Virginia
 An episode of Death Valley Days From Season 2